This page provides the summaries of the OFC Third Round matches for 2014 FIFA World Cup qualification.

Format
The third round saw the two group winners and two group runners-up from the 2012 OFC Nations Cup compete in a single group of four teams.

The matches were played in a double round-robin between 7 September 2012 and 26 March 2013, with the top team advancing to the play-off against the fourth-placed team from the CONCACAF Fourth Round.

Qualified teams

Matches

The draw for the fixtures was conducted at OFC Headquarters in Auckland, New Zealand on 26 June 2012.

Goalscorers
There were 41 goals scored in 12 games, for an average of 3.42 goals per game.

6 goals
 Georges Gope-Fenepej

4 goals
 César Lolohea

3 goals

 Chris Killen
 Shane Smeltz

2 goals

 Roy Kayara
 Michael McGlinchey
 Tim Payne
 Chris Wood
 Henry Fa'arodo

1 goal

 Jacques Haeko
 Iamel Kabeu
 Bertrand Kaï
 Kosta Barbarouses
 Tony Lochhead
 
 Marco Rojas
 Ben Sigmund
 Tommy Smith
 Joses Nawo
 Tutizama Tanito
 Himson Teleda
 Heimano Bourebare
 Samuel Hyanine

1 own goal
 Tome Faisi (playing against New Caledonia)
 Xavier Samin (playing against New Caledonia)

References

External links
Results and schedule (FIFA.com version)
Results and schedule (oceaniafootball.com version)

3rd Round
qual